Orange and Lemons is a Filipino pop rock band founded and formed in 1999 by lead vocalist and guitarist Clem Castro along with Ace and JM del Mundo. Former member, Mcoy Fundales served as the lead vocalist and guitarist since its formation until its last reception in 2007. The group's musical genre's been a mix of alternative rock, indie pop and experimental music and heavily influenced by several well-respected bands in different generations like The Smiths, The Beatles and the Eraserheads. The band had released three several albums and gained commercial success with their sophomore album Strike Whilst the Iron is Hot released in 2005.

The group parted ways in 2007 due to musical differences. Following the band's break up several members formed their own groups. Mcoy Fundales formed Kenyo alongside JM and Ace del Mundo. While, Clem formed his own indie group The Camerawalls with the band's original member, Law Santiago.

In 2017, after 10 years on hiatus, the band announced that they would reunite as a trio, and later as a quartet when keyboardist Jared Nerona joined.

History
The band name "Oranges and Lemons" was initially recommended by a former member of the group. Apparently the band was not aware at the time that the name was actually derived from a British nursery rhyme and a title of an album by the British band XTC.

Clem Castro and Mcoy Fundales met in high school in the mid-1990s. The duo formed a group with friends (with Law Santiago and Michael Salvador) from their province of Bulacan and went through several names such before eventually settling on Orange and Lemons. Brothers Ace and JM del Mundo were in a band called Colossal Youth when they met Castro and Fundales in a local bar in Bulacan in 1999. Castro and Fundales with two other friends were handled by Roldan "Bong" Baluyot of No Seat Affair (a local management, booking and production outfit) when they recorded a two-track demo ("She's Leaving Home", "Isang Gabi") in 1999 as Orange and Lemons. The song "She's Leaving Home" soon found its way to radio station NU107.5 FM's playlist.

The band went on hiatus in 2000, but was reformed in 2003 with the del Mundos in the line-up permanently.They started arranging and rehearsing original songs that would eventually end up in their debut album, Love in the Land of Rubber Shoes and Dirty Ice Cream. which was released on December 3, 2003 With a style of retro music combined with alternative rock, the band's main musical influences ranged from The Beatles and The Smiths, to The Cure and Eraserheads.

Castro and Fundales contacted Bong Baluyot to once again handle the band and ten songs were recorded in three days due to a limited financial budget. After the songs were recorded, Baluyot once again started scouting around for a label that would take the group in.

The band had their first gig stint in a club in Makati City called Where Else? It was in one of those gigs that ONL met Toti Dalmacion, formerly of Groove Nation, a local music store famous for rare and hard-to-find vinyl records. Dalmacion was already toying with the idea of establishing an independent label that he would call Terno Recordings. The label would showcase unsigned and talented Filipino artists with a unique sound and style that could (hopefully) pass international standards. He proposed that ONL be the flagship artist for the label. A one-album deal was signed.

ONL's 10-track debut album, Love in the Land of Rubber Shoes and Dirty Ice Cream was independently released and launched in December 2003. The album's single "(Just Like) A Splendid Love Song" got radio airplay on NU107.5 FM and reached the station's number 1 spot in their weekly countdown. Orange and Lemons was declared Best New Artist for 2004 in NU107's yearly Rock Awards event.

ONL signed a contract with Universal Records in October 2004. The band proceeded to record a new album; their second and first under a major label. Strike Whilst The Iron Is Hot was completed and released in April 28, 2005, with singles including "Hanggang Kailan (Umuwi Ka Na Baby)" release in April 1, 2005, "Heaven Knows (This Angel Has Flown)" released on September 16, 2005, and "Lihim". One of the band's biggest breaks came with an offer from Philippine media giant ABS-CBN for ONL to do the jingle/soundtrack for a new series Pinoy Big Brother, the Philippine franchised version of the reality TV show Big Brother. ONL came up with a song called "Pinoy Ako" released on September 2, 2005.

Other projects of the band included "Abot Kamay" (a song for a shampoo advertisement) and "Blue Moon" (their version of the classic track for a movie theme song).

In June 2005, Orange and Lemons was featured on MTV Philippines in its Rising Star segment, and in March 2006 they were featured in the "Lokal Artist of the Month" segment. Orange and Lemons were named "Artist of the Year" at the NU107's Rock Awards for 2005.

The release of the tribute album of the Apo Hiking Society, Kami nAPO Muna in 2006, where the band contributed one track, gave Orange and Lemons the spotlight again. Orange and Lemons once again did their take on yet another Apo song "Tuloy na Tuloy Pa Rin Ang Pasko" by December 2006. The song was used by ABS-CBN for their Christmas station ID. As a follow-up to "Abot Kamay", the band completed a song from Unilever Philippines called "Let Me" and was used for another shampoo advertisement. Universal Records released their third and last album on June 8, 2007 called Moonlane Gardens. Their first single in that album was "Ang Katulad Mong Walang Katulad" and their last single before they disbanded was "Fade".

Break-up

It was reported on October 10, 2007 by the Inquirer.net that Orange and Lemons had disbanded. The reason stated was primarily due to differences between band members and their managers. Clem Castro, the then lead guitarist of the band, then started his own band, 3-piece indie pop group  The Camerawalls signed under his own label, Lilystars Records. He formed the band with original Orange and Lemons bassist Law. The three remaining band members formed a new band called Kenyo.

Reuniting

In July 2017, after 10 years on hiatus, the band announced on its official Facebook page that they were going to reform as a trio, involving Clem Castro on vocals and lead guitars, JM del Mundo on bass guitar, and Ace del Mundo on drums. In August 2018, the band headlined Moonlane Festival, a concert that it also produced.

On February 10, the band's label Lilystars Records announced via Twitter that the band would be recording and releasing a new album in 2021, their first release in fourteen years.

Controversies
Allegations have been made that the melody and musical arrangement of the band's breakout single "Pinoy Ako", also used as a theme song in the reality show Pinoy Big Brother, was stolen from an obscure single, "Chandeliers" by the 1980s English new wave band Care. It was later on found out that the allegations were somehow true since the song and Care's were very similar, with the tune imitated all throughout song.

Personnel
Current members
Clementine "Clem" Castro - lead vocals, lead guitar (1999–2007, 2017–present)
JM del Mundo - bass guitar (2001–2007, 2017–present); backing vocals (2017–present)
Ace del Mundo - drums (2001–2007, 2017–present); backing vocals (2017–present)
 Jared Nerona - keyboards (2018–present)

Early members

Mcoy Fundales - co-lead vocals, rhythm and acoustic guitar (1999–2007)
Law Santiago - bass guitar (1999–2001)
Michael Salvador - drums (1999–2001)

Discography

Albums
Love in the Land of Rubber Shoes and Dirty Ice Cream (Terno Recordings, 2003)
Strike Whilst the Iron Is Hot (Universal Records, 2005) (repackaged edition release in October 25, 2005)
Moonlane Gardens (Universal Records, 2007)
Love in the Land of Rubber Shoes and Dirty Ice Cream - 15th Anniversary Edition (Lilystars Records, 2018)
La Bulaqueña (Lilystars Records, 2022)

Singles
"Hanggang Kailan" (Universal Records, 2005)
"Pinoy Ako" (Universal Records, 2005) (covered by Rico Blanco for Pinoy Big Brother: Kumunity Season 10)
"Lovers Go, Lovers Come" (Lilystars Records, 2017)
"Pag-Ibig sa Tabing Dagat" (Lilystars Records, 2019)
"Ikaw ang Aking Tahanan" (Lilystars Records, 2019)
"Yakapin Natin ang Gabi" (Lilystars Records, 2021)

Tribute album appearances
Ultraelectromagneticjam! - a tribute to Eraserheads ("Huwag Kang Matakot") (2005)
Kami nAPO Muna - a tribute to APO Hiking Society ("Yakap sa Dilim") (2006)

Christmas album appearances
Not Another Christmas Album - JAM 88.3 ("Christmas Daydreams") (2004)
OPM Gold Christmas Album ("Tuloy na Tuloy Pa Rin ang Pasko") (2006)
Close Up Season of Smiles ("God Rest Ye Merry Gentlemen") (2006)

Other appearances
NU 107 Super Size Rock (Warner Music Philippines, 2004)
Jack Lives Here (2004)
Pinoy Ako (Star Music, 2005)
Super! The Biggest Opm Hits of the Year (2006)
Musika sa Bahay ni Kuya: The Best of Pinoy Big Brother Hits (Star Music, 2008)
i-Star 15: The Best of Inspirational Songs (Star Music, 2010)
Super Astig Hits (Universal Records, 2016)

Awards and nominations

References

Filipino rock music groups
Musical groups established in 1999
Musical groups disestablished in 2007
Musical groups reestablished in 2010
Musical groups disestablished in 2010
Musical groups reestablished in 2017
1999 establishments in the Philippines